MAQ could refer to:
 Macquarie Telecom Group (ASX stock symbol: MAQ)
 Mae Sot Airport in Thailand, (IATA code: MAQ)
 Mangalore Central railway station (Station code: MAQ)
 Martinique, UNDP country code
 Medical Anthropology Quarterly, an international peer-reviewed academic journal 
 Museum of the American Quilter's Society